Mount Olivet Cemetery is a cemetery in the Dayton section of Newark in the U.S. state of New Jersey founded in 1871. It is part of the Roman Catholic Archdiocese of Newark.

The Newark City Cemetery is located nearby.

Notable burials
 John T. Dunn (1838–1907), represented New Jersey in the United States House of Representatives from 1893 to 1895.
 Charles P. Gillen (1876–1956), Mayor of Newark, New Jersey from 1917 to 1921.

References

External links
 Mt. Olivet Cemetery at The Political Graveyard
 Mount Olivet Cemetery at Find A Grave

Cemeteries in Newark, New Jersey
1871 establishments in New Jersey